Mateus Levendi (born 23 March 1993) is an Albanian professional footballer who currently plays for Turbina Cërrik in the Albanian First Division.

Honours

Club

Tirana
 Albanian Supercup: (1) 2017

References

1993 births
Living people
Footballers from Tirana
Albanian footballers
Association football forwards
Albania youth international footballers
KF Tirana players
FK Partizani Tirana players
KF Gramshi players
FC Kevitan players
KS Egnatia Rrogozhinë players
KS Burreli players
KS Turbina Cërrik players
Kategoria Superiore players
Kategoria e Parë players
Kategoria e Dytë players